Michael Faraday was an early 19th-century British scientist (physicist and chemist).

Faraday may also refer to:

Places
 Faraday, Victoria, Australia
 Faraday, Ontario, Canada
 Faraday, an electoral ward in  Greater London
 Faraday, West Virginia, US

Ships
 CS Faraday (1874), a Siemens AG cable ship
 CS Faraday (1923), a Siemens AG cable ship

Other uses
 Faraday (unit), a unit of charge
 Faraday (crater), a lunar crater
 Faraday (company), a New Jersey company specializing in fire protection
 37582 Faraday, a main-belt asteroid
 Faraday building, a telephone exchange in London
 Faraday Hall, a hall of residence at Loughborough University
 Faraday Research Station, a former British research station in Antarctica
 Faraday Dam, a dam on the Clackamas River in Oregon
 Faraday, a character in the Wayfarer Redemption series by Sara Douglass
 Faraday, a fictional planet in Rocannon's World by Ursula K. Le Guin

People with the surname 
 David Faraday, victim of the Zodiac Killer
 Philip Michael Faraday, English lawyer, composer and theatrical producer

Fictional characters
 Faraday, lead character in the Showtime series The Man Who Fell To Earth
 Daniel Faraday, a character on Lost
 King Faraday, a secret agent featured in DC Comics
 Max Faraday, the title character of Divine Right: The Adventures of Max Faraday
 Helen Faraday, the title character in Blonde Venus, as well as her husband Edward Faraday and son Johnny Faraday.
 Joshua Faraday, a character in The Magnificent Seven
 Kay Faraday, a character from Ace Attorney Investigations
 Dr. Louis Faraday, a NASA scientist from Flight of the Navigator
 Michael Faraday, tutor of Rowan Damish and Citra Terranova in the book Scythe

See also 
 farad, an SI unit of capacitance
 Faraday cage, an enclosure of conductive mesh used to block electric fields
 Faraday constant, an amount of electric charge
 Faraday cup
 Faraday Flashlight, a mechanically powered flashlight
 Faraday Future, American electric vehicle manufacturer
 Faraday Prize (disambiguation)
 Faraday's law of induction